The Hetty Taylor was a schooner that sank in Lake Michigan off the coast of Sheboygan, Wisconsin, United States. In 2005 the shipwreck site was added to the National Register of Historic Places.

History
The Hetty Taylor was launched in 1874. She mostly hauled wood products. The ship carried cargo from ports including ones in Muskegon, Michigan, Green Bay, Wisconsin, Sister Bay, Wisconsin and Egg Harbor, Wisconsin to her homeport in Milwaukee, Wisconsin. Additionally, the Hetty Taylor carried numerous types of cargo from Milwaukee to other ports.

On August 26, 1880, the Hetty Taylor was en route to Escanaba, Michigan from Milwaukee when she encountered a sudden squall. The crew was able to row to safety in a small boat, hoping to find help and recover the ship before she sank. However, by the time they were able to return, it was too late.

References

Sheboygan County, Wisconsin
Shipwrecks of Lake Michigan
Shipwrecks of the Wisconsin coast
Shipwrecks on the National Register of Historic Places in Wisconsin
National Register of Historic Places in Sheboygan County, Wisconsin
Maritime incidents in August 1880